Ilie Năstase defeated Arthur Ashe in the final, 3–6, 6–3, 6–7(1–5), 6–4, 6–3 to win the men's singles tennis title at the 1972 US Open.

Stan Smith was the defending champion, but lost in the quarterfinals to Ashe.

12-time singles major champion Roy Emerson made his last major appearance, losing in the first round to Fred Stolle.

Seeds
The seeded players are listed below. Ilie Năstase is the champion; others show the round in which they were eliminated.

  Stan Smith (quarterfinalist)
  Ken Rosewall (second round)
  Rod Laver (fourth round)
  Ilie Năstase (champion)
  John Newcombe (third round)
  Arthur Ashe (finalist)
  Tom Okker (third round)
  Jan Kodeš (second round)
  Marty Riessen (third round)
  Manuel Orantes (third round)
  Cliff Drysdale (fourth round)
  Cliff Richey (semifinalist)
  Bob Lutz (fourth round)
  Andrés Gimeno (fourth round)
  Jimmy Connors (first round)
  Bob Hewitt (fourth round)

Draw

Key
 Q = Qualifier
 WC = Wild card
 LL = Lucky loser
 r = Retired

Final eight

Top half

Section 1

Section 2

Section 4

Bottom half

Section 5

Section 6

Section 7

Section 8

External links
 Association of Tennis Professionals (ATP) – 1972 US Open Men's Singles draw
1972 US Open – Men's draws and results at the International Tennis Federation

Men's singles
US Open (tennis) by year – Men's singles